Proprotein convertase subtilisin/kexin type 1 inhibitor is a protein by the name of proSAAS that in humans is encoded by the PCSK1N gene.

Function

This protein is expressed largely in cells possessing a regulated secretory pathway, such as endocrine/neuroendocrine cells and neurons. The intact proSAAS protein, as well as the carboxyy-terminal peptide containing the inhibitory hexapeptide LLRVKR, functions as an inhibitor of prohormone convertase 1/3, which regulates the proteolytic cleavage of  peptide precursors. ProSAAS is further processed at the N- and C-termini into multiple short peptides, leaving the central segment intact.  This central, unprocessed portion of the protein may function as a neural- and endocrine-specific chaperone due to its potent ability to block the aggregation of beta amyloid and alpha synuclein in vitro, and to block oligomer cytotoxicity in cells. Differential expression of this gene may be associated with obesity.

References

Further reading